Morimus is a genus of beetle in family Cerambycidae.

Species
 Morimus asper (Sulzer, 1776)
 Morimus assamensis Breuning, 1936
 Morimus funereus Mulsant, 1863
 Morimus granulipennis Breuning, 1939
 Morimus inaequalis Waterhouse, 1881
 Morimus indicus Breuning, 1936
 Morimus lethalis Thomson, 1857
 Morimus misellus Breuning, 1938
 Morimus orientalis Reitter, 1894
 Morimus ovalis Breuning, 1943
 Morimus plagiatus Waterhouse, 1881
 Morimus sexmaculipennis Breuning, 1961

References
 Biolib
 Worldwide Cerambycoidea Photo Gallery

Phrissomini
Taxonomy articles created by Polbot